Anangur railway station serves the village of Anangur in Thiruchengode taluk, Namakkal district, Tamil Nadu, India.

References

Railway stations in Namakkal district
Salem railway division